William Russell Geist (born May 3, 1975) is an American television personality and journalist. He is co-anchor of MSNBC's Morning Joe and anchor of Sunday Today with Willie Geist. Geist also frequently serves as a fill-in anchor on both the weekday edition and the saturday edition of Today. Geist is a correspondent for NBC News and NBC Sports, hosting and contributing to NBC's Olympic coverage. Geist has hosted the Macy's Fourth of July Fireworks and Rockefeller Center Christmas Tree Lighting on NBC.

Geist is the author or co-author of two books that have appeared on The New York Times bestseller list: Good Talk, Dad – written in 2014 with his father Bill Geist – and American Freak Show: The Completely Fabricated Stories of Our New National Treasures, released in 2010. His third book, the self-help satire Loaded! Become a Millionaire Overnight and Lose 20 Pounds in 2 Weeks or Your Money Back!, was released in 2011.

Early life 
Geist was born in Evanston, Illinois, the son of newspaper columnist and broadcast journalist Bill Geist and social worker Jody Geist. Geist is the older brother of Libby Geist Wildes, the Academy Award-winning documentary film producer of O.J.: Made in America and The Last Dance. He is the great-grandson of former Detroit Red Wings star and Hockey Hall of Fame player Herbie Lewis.

Geist attended George Washington Middle School in Ridgewood, New Jersey where he met his future wife, Christina Sharkey. They began dating at Ridgewood High School, where he was captain of both the basketball and football teams, winning the 1991 state football title. He was elected to New Jersey Boys State and the National Honor Society. Geist graduated cum laude from Vanderbilt University in 1997 with a Bachelor of Arts in political science and French, where he was an editor of the school's newspaper, The Vanderbilt Hustler.

Career 
Geist began his career as an editor and producer for CNN Sports Illustrated and subsequently a field producer and reporter for CNN Sports, where he covered the Super Bowl, the NCAA Final Four, and The Masters.

Geist began substituting as a co-host on MSNBC's 6–9 a.m. morning time slot almost immediately after Don Imus was fired in late April 2007. Geist was named permanent co-host of Morning Joe, along with Joe Scarborough and Mika Brzezinski in September 2007. In late July 2009, Geist began hosting his own 30-minute program Way Too Early with Willie Geist, which aired at 5:30 a.m. immediately before Morning Joe on MSNBC. In 2010, Geist began substituting for Matt Lauer as host of the Today Show and as the show's newsreader. In November 2012, Geist became an official co-host of Today and left Way Too Early. In 2016, Geist was made solo-host of the new Sunday Today that launched in April. Additionally Geist has contributed to NBC Sports and NBC News's coverage of every Olympic Games since 2010.

Geist solo anchored NBC's hours-long coverage of the Orlando nightclub shooting on the morning of June 12, 2016. Geist was on the air for seven successive hours in an NBC News Special Report that aired across the United States. Geist and Sunday TODAY earned the prestigious Edward R. Murrow Award for similar coverage on August 4, 2019, the morning after mass shootings in El Paso, Texas and Dayton, Ohio.

In addition to his political interviews on Morning Joe during the week, Geist has earned a reputation on Sunday TODAY as a well-regarded long-form profile interviewer of the biggest celebrities in the world.

Geist hosts the popular Sunday Sitdown podcast, which features the full-length, unedited versions of his Sunday TODAY television profile interviews.

Willie Geist later did voice work in Kung Fu Panda 3 where he voiced Sum opposite of Al Roker's Dim where their characters are twin panda brothers who are related to Po, and has made cameos in several other movies and television shows.

He is a frequent guest on Andy Cohen's late night Bravo show "Watch What Happens Live", where he often is paired with a Real Housewife.

Geist has appeared twice in People magazine's "Sexiest Men Alive" issue, in 2012 and 2017.

Saturday Night Live cast member Mikey Day impersonates Geist during SNL's sketches about Morning Joe.

In 2019, Geist participated with Jenna Bush Hager in a special episode of How Low Will You Go, that aired on the Today Show.

Personal life 
On May 24, 2003, Geist married his high school sweetheart Christina Sharkey, in Humacao, Puerto Rico. The couple has a daughter, Lucie Joy, and a son, George William. He is an Independent.

Geist sits on the board of the Michael J. Fox Foundation for Parkinson's Research. His father, former New York Times columnist and CBS News journalist Bill Geist, has Parkinson's disease.

Geist also is a board member at Operation Mend, an organization at UCLA Medical Center that provides free surgery and care to America's most severely injured military veterans.

On November 7, 2021, Geist ran the 50th annual New York City Marathon to raise money for the Michael J. Fox Foundation. He finished his first marathon in 3:58:23 (the average time for a man his age is 4:11:45) and raised more than $500,000 for Parkinson's Disease research, entirely in small donations. Geist ran part of the race carrying a friend's engagement ring and handed it to him along the course in Central Park where his friend then proposed.

Career timeline 
 (2004–2005): I, Max, Writer/Producer
 (2005–present) MSNBC/NBC News/NBC Sports
 (2005–2008): Tucker (formerly The Situation with Tucker Carlson)
 (2006–present): Zeitgeist Host
 (2006–2007): Scarborough Country
 (2007–present): Morning Joe Co-Anchor
 (2009–2012): Way Too Early Host
 (2011–present): NBC News correspondent
 (2012–present): NBC Sports contributor
 (2012–2016): Today Show Third Hour Co-Anchor
 (2012–present): Today Show 7–9 am contributor and fill-in news, Orange Room and co-anchor
 (April 17, 2016–present): Sunday Today with Willie Geist Anchor

References

External links 
 
 
 
 2009 Miss USA judge official biography

Living people
American humorists
American television personalities
MSNBC people
People from Ridgewood, New Jersey
Ridgewood High School (New Jersey) alumni
Vanderbilt University alumni
Writers from Evanston, Illinois
Writers from New Jersey
Writers from Tennessee
1975 births